Maria Carolina Cruse Ribeiro Gomes Martins (born 9 July 1999) is a Portuguese professional racing cyclist who currently rides for UCI Women's Continental Team . In October 2019, she won the bronze medal in the women's scratch event at the 2019 UEC European Track Championships.

Major results

Road

2017
 7th Road race, EUC European Junior Road Championships
2018
 National Road Championships
2nd Road race
2nd Time trial
2019
 2nd Clasica Femenina Navarra
 4th Road race, EUC European Under–23 Road Championships
2021
 1st  Road race, National Road Championships
 3rd Ronde de Mouscron
2022
 5th Classic Brugge–De Panne
 8th GP Oetingen

Track

2018
UEC European Track Championships - u23
3rd  Scratch race
2019
UEC European Track Championships
3rd  Scratch Race
UEC European Track Championships - u23
2nd  Elimination race
2020
UCI World Championships
3rd  Scratch Race
UEC European Track Championships
3rd  Elimination Race
UEC European Track Championships - u23
2nd  Elimination race
3rd  Scratch race
2021
Olympic Games
7th Omnium
UEC European Track Championships - u23
1st  Omnium 
2nd  Scratch race
2nd  Elimination race

References

External links

1999 births
People from Santarém, Portugal
Living people
Portuguese female cyclists
European Games competitors for Portugal
Cyclists at the 2019 European Games
Cyclists at the 2020 Summer Olympics
Olympic cyclists of Portugal
Sportspeople from Santarém District